Tonga sent a delegation to compete at the 2008 Summer Paralympics in Beijing, China. 

The Tonga National Olympic Committee initially reported that the country's sole representative would be Sione Manu, in the men's shot put. However, in the end, Manu was not part of Tonga's delegation, and the nation's single competitor was Mounga Okusitino, in the men's 100 metre sprint for athletes with cerebral palsy.

Athletics

See also
Tonga at the Paralympics
Tonga at the 2008 Summer Olympics

External links
International Paralympic Committee

References 

Nations at the 2008 Summer Paralympics
2008
Summer Paralympics